Daisha McBride, also known as "The Rap Girl", is an American rapper and songwriter."

Early life 
Born January 2, 1996, McBride is from Knoxville, Tennessee. She was first introduced to music through church, where she would often sing in the choir, and play the violin and piano. Starting from the age of 10, she became introduced into the Hip-Hop/Rap scene when she wasn't able to give her father anything for Father's Day, instead, she delivered him with a Father's Day rap. She took Rap more seriously after somebody told her, "Your talent is God's gift to you and what you do with it is your gift back to God."  McBride graduated from Harden Valley Academy in Knoxville, Tennessee in 2014. She is currently attending Middle Tennessee State University (MTSU) for her Bachelor's in Music Business.

Career 
Also being referred to as "The Rap Girl", she achieved this nickname through High School as being one the kids always freestyling in the lunch room. The success came after her constant dedication of uploading "freestyle videos" to YouTube back in 2011. She reached renown internet fame through, at the time, Twitter's update for uploading videos as well as Instagram and Vine videos around 2015. She's often stated that some of her main inspirations being Nicki Minaj, Kehlani, and Missy Elliot, whom she has also been recognized. McBride has released 2 EPs to date. Her first EP being "The Come Up", which was released after her quick social growth in 2015. Her most recent EP, "The Journey",  was released in 2017, which features her single "Mood", produced by Big Bruno. The EP also features production from The Cratez, Donato, and Big Bruno.

Discography

Singles

Albums & EPs

References 

American women rappers
1996 births
Living people
Rappers from Tennessee
People from Knoxville, Tennessee
American women singer-songwriters
Singer-songwriters from Tennessee
21st-century American rappers
21st-century American women musicians
21st-century women rappers